The Minnesota Vixen is a professional women's football team based in the Twin Cities. The team has been known as the Minnesota Vixens and Minneapolis Vixens prior to being known as the Vixen (note lack of "s").

Established in 1999, the Vixen are the longest continuously operating women's American football team in the nation. The team plays full contact, tackle football following NCAA rules. The season is from April to June each year with playoffs in July.

In 2014, the Vixen's record was 6-2 with an invite to the inaugural Legacy Bowl in South Carolina. In 2016, the team went undefeated in the regular season winning the IWFL Midwest Division. They then faced the New York Shark for the IWFL Eastern Conference Championship, winning in double overtime and appeared in the IWFL World Championship Game in South Carolina against the Utah Falconz. In 2017, the Vixen changed leagues and joined the Women's Football Alliance (WFA) where they continue to compete on a national level. Since joinging the WFA the Vixen have appeared in 3 national championship games, 2018, 2021 and 2022.

Since 2015, the Vixen have partnered with Town Square Television to have all Minnesota Vixen home games televised live along with live web streaming. In 2019, the Vixen were the first women's team to offer live broadcast of all regular season games including both home and away via Town Square Television. 

Laura Brown is the current owner of the Vixen and has run team operations with James Brown since 2014. Laura Brown was named to the WFA's Owner's Board in October, 2018.

History

1999 Barnstorming Tour
Vixen history dates back to 1999, when businessmen Carter Turner and Terry Sullivan decided to explore the feasibility of a professional women's football league by gathering together top female athletes from across the United States and dividing them into two teams for a nationwide series of exhibition game. More than 100 women attended tryouts. The teams were named the Minnesota Vixens and the Lake Michigan Minx, and the "No Limits" Barnstorming Tour featured six games in such locations as Miami, Chicago, and New York. The final exhibition game was played at the Hubert H. Humphrey Metrodome in Minneapolis (known worldwide as home to the National Football League's Minnesota Vikings). While the Vixens lost the game by a score of 30-27, the tour's success inspired the expansion of the Women's Professional Football League to 11 teams in 2000.

2000: WPFL kicks off
The success of the tour led Turner and Sullivan to form the Women's Professional Football League; although the Minx would not join the Vixen in the WPFL's first full season, the Austin Rage, Colorado Valkyries, Daytona Beach Barracudas, Houston Energy, Miami Fury, New England Storm, New York Galaxy, New York Sharks, Oklahoma City Wildcats, and Tampa Tempest would join the Vixen to form the WPFL's inaugural roster of teams. The Vixen would finish the regular season unbeaten at 5-0, clinch the Central Division title, and ensure home-field advantage throughout the American Conference playoffs. However, that playoff run would only last one game, as the Vixen lost the American Conference Championship Game to the eventual WPFL Champion Houston Energy by a score of 35-14.

2001 
The Vixen played a three-game season, going 1-2 against the Arizona Caliente and the Indianapolis Vipers.

2002
The Vixen finished 2-3 and fourth place in the National Conference.

2003
The Vixen finished 2-7 and fourth place in the American Conference, North Division.

2004
The Vixen finished 6-4 and second place in the National Conference, North Division, qualifying for the playoffs for the first time in four years. However, they would lose the National Conference Semifinal game to the Delaware Griffins.

2005
Once again, the Vixen finished 6-4, second place in the North Division, and qualified for a playoff spot. Although they defeated the Indiana Speed in the National Conference Semifinal, the Vixen lost to the New York Dazzles in the National Conference Championship game.

2006
The Vixen finished 2-6 and third place in the National Conference, East Division.

2007
In their final year in the WPFL, the Vixen finished 2-5 and third place in the National Conference, North Division. Soon afterwards, the Vixen left the WPFL to join the National Women's Football Association.

2008
In their first and only year in the NWFA, the Vixen qualified for the playoffs for the first time in three years, finishing 6-2 and second place in the Northern Conference, North Division. However, that playoff run would only last one game, as the Vixen lost by a score of 31-7 to the North Division Champions and eventual NWFA runners-up West Michigan Mayhem. After the season ended, the Vixen switched leagues again, this time to the Independent Women's Football League.

2014
In 2014, the current owner Laura Brown acquired the Vixen and runs operations with co-owner James Brown. They named Brandon Pelinka head coach along with Damion Topping as defensive coordinator and Adam Griffith as special teams coordinator. The Vixen also brought in 2 new coaches: running backs coach Jeff Gehring and defensive backs coach Darrion Branscomb. That season, the Vixen went 6-2 and appeared in the Legacy Bowl, facing the Carolina Queens. In 2014, the Minnesota Vixen also established a relationship with Northwestern Health Sciences University as their Official Integrative Sports Care Provider.

2015
In 2015, the Vixen moved to their current home stadium, Simley Athletic Field in Inver Grove Heights and brought in Brian Mr_Announcerguy Sweeney as the stadium voice for the team. In addition, Town Square Television started televising all Vixen home games and offering live web-stream as well. The team had another successful year, finishing 6–2, just missing the post-season.

2016
The Vixen added Coach Danny Ekstrand as wide receivers coach in 2016. The Vixen team then went undefeated (8-0) with the Vixen defense only allowing one touchdown the entire regular season. They earned their first IWFL Midwest Division Title. The Vixen then hosted the New York Sharks at home stadium Simley Athletic Field setting a new attendance record of over 1,100 fans. The Vixen won the game in double overtime with a 101-yard interception returned for a touchdown by rookie Crystal Ninas. The winning play was highlighted on ESPN's Sports Center's Top Tens Plays of the Week and earned the Vixen's firsts ever conference title. The Vixen then went on to face the Utah Falconz in the IWFL World Championship Game in South Carolina losing 6-49.

2017
In 2017, the Minnesota Vixen departed the IWFL and joined the Women's Football Alliance (WFA) where they continued to compete on a national level with over 60 teams across the nation. Joining the coaching staff was Coach Stefan Dahl Holm as the Line Coach.

The team finished the regular season 6-2. In the first round of the playoffs, the Vixen were victorious over the Kansas City Titans, only to fall to the Dallas Elite in round 2. Dallas then continued on to win the WFA 2018 Division I National Championship.

2018
The new tradition of winning continued with the Vixen as they completed their twentieth season 7-1 and rolled through the playoffs to reach the WFA Division II National Championship. Owner Laura Brown stepped in to lead the way as the new head coach with Assistant Head coach, Jeff Gehring. Notably, Coach Laura Brown was the first female head coach of the Minnesota Vixen. Other new additions to the Vixen coaching staff included Defensive Coordinator Nick Leach, Wide Receivers Coach J. Alfred Potter, Line Coaches John Taylor and Bruce Brevitz, Strength and Conditioning Coach Andrew Carbone, Line Backers intern Jason Cornelison and newly promoted Offensive Coordinator Danny Ekstrand. Coach Adam Griffith continued on, now in his tenth season as the Vixen's Special Teams Coordinator.

Coming off the success of his previous three seasons as the voice of the Vixen, Brian Mr AnnouncerGuy Sweeney was asked by the WFA commissioner to become the broadcast voice for the Division 1 National Championship Games on ESPN.

During the regular season, the Vixen defeated the Madison Blaze, the Wisconsin Dragons, the Detroit Dark Angels, the Columbus Vanguards and split the series with the Kansas City Titans resulting in their only loss in the regular season. After a first round bye in the playoffs, the Vixen then hosted the Wisconsin Dragons followed by the Mile High Blaze to become the WFA 2018 American Conference Champions and secure a spot in the national championship game where they faced the New York Sharks. The Sharks were victorious leaving the Vixen with an overall 9-2 record on the 2018 season. Of note head coach, Laura Brown, and her coaching staff were named the WFA All-American Coaches for the 2018 American Conference. Later, in October 2019 Owner Laura Brown was voted onto the Owner's Board for the WFA.

2019 
In 2019, Ryan McCauley was brought in as head coach along with several other coaching staff including R.J. Speidel as the Defensive Coordinator, Matt O'Keefe as Running Backs Coach, and Shaun Mattson with Jim Speidel as Quarterbacks Coaches. Furthermore, two long term Vixen players, Jessica Giesemann and Michele Braun retired from their playing careers to step into coaching roles with linebackers and offensive Line respectively. Coaches J. Alfred Potter, Bruce Brevitz and Jason Cornelison have continued in their respective positions as well to complete the 2019 coaching staff. Returning to the Vixen coaching staff to help with wide receivers is former Vixen coach Emilie Sundberg. In an effort to expand the Vixen fan base, the team moved stadiums to the suburb of Edina and also joined forces with RICCI Media to be the first Women's football team to expand their broadcasts to include all road games as well as home games.

2020 
In 2020, like most teams in the athletic world, The Vixen were forced to take a year off due to the Covid-19 pandemic. The team continued to safely train in their own time and will be ready for 2021. Not all was bad during 2020. The Vixen's longest tenured announcer, Brian Mr Announcerguy Sweeney was awarded the NASPAA Bob Shepard Announcer of the Year Award and recognized as the top high school announcer in the country.

2021 
In 2021, the WFA decided to give teams around the country time to get ready after so many of them were under different forms of restrictions. The league decided that the season would be shortened by 25% and the season would start in May instead of April. Coach McCauley returned for his 2nd season and the Vixen moved home games to Concordia St Paul. This centralized location between downtown Minneapolis and St Paul would help to bring in fans from all corners of the Twin Cities. Also this year Brian Mr AnnouncerGuy Sweeney and Alex Westad took over the broadcast of the road games to again give Vixen Fans a chance to see 100% of the teams games. Along with his many team duties, Brian continued to expand his league role by hosting a weekly show for For The Fans Network to highlight the WFA's Game of the Week.

Season by season 

|-
| colspan="6" align="center" | Minnesota Vixen (WPFL)
|-
|1999 || 0 || 6 || 0 || || No Limits Barnstorming Tour
|-
|2000 || 5 || 1 || 0 || 1st American Central || Lost American Conference Championship (Houston)
|-
|2001 || 1 || 2 || 0 || Exhibition Team || --
|-
|2002 || 2 || 3 || 0 || 4th National || --
|-
|2003 || 3 || 7 || 0 || 4th American North || --
|-
|2004 || 6 || 5 || 0 || 2nd National North || Lost National Conference Semifinal (Delaware)
|-
|2005 || 6 || 5 || 0 || 2nd National North || Won National Conference Qualifier (Indiana)Lost National Conference Championship (New York)
|-
|2006 || 1 || 6 || 0 || 3rd National East || --
|-
|2007 || 3 || 5 || 0 || 3rd North Central || --
|-
| colspan="6" align="center" | Minnesota Vixen (NWFA)
|-
|2008 || 6 || 3 || 0 || 2nd North North || Lost Northern Conference Quarterfinal (West Michigan)
|-
| colspan="6" align="center" | Minnesota Vixen (IWFL)
|-
|2009 || 2 || 6 || 0 || 3rd Tier I West Midwest || --
|-
|2010 || 0 || 8 || 0 || 8th Tier II West Midwest || --
|-
|2011 || 0 || 8 || 0 || 4th West-Mid West Division || --
|-
|2012 || 2 || 6 || 0 || 4th Midwest Division || --
|-
|2013 || 6 || 4 || 0 || 3rd Midwest Division || Lost Tier II Western Conference Championship (Arlington Impact)
|-
|2014 || 6 || 3 || 0 || 2nd Midwest Division || Lost 2014 Legacy Bowl (Carolina Queens)
|-90bbbbbbcccccccccccc
|2015 || 6 || 2 || 0 || 2nd Midwest Division || --
|-
|2016 || 9 || 1 || 0 || 1st Midwest DivisionEastern Conference Champions || Won Tier I Semifinals (New York Sharks)Lost Tier I Championship (Utah Falconz)
|-
| colspan="6" align="center" | Minnesota Vixen (WFA)
|-
|2017 || 7 || 3 || 0 || 2nd Great Plains (Division I) || Won First Round Playoff Game (Kansas City Titans)Lost Second round Playoff game (Dallas Elite)
|-
|2018 || 9 || 2 || 0 || 1st Midwest Region (Division II)American Conference Champions || 1st Round Playoff ByeWonSecond Round Playoff Game (Wisconsin Dragons) Won Div II Semifinals(Mile High Blaze)Lost Division II Championship (New York Sharks)
|-
|2019 || 7 || 2 || 0 || 2nd Midwest Region (Division II)|| Lost Conference 1/4 final round (St Louis)
|-
|2020 || 0 || 0 || 0 || Season cancelled due to Covid-19
|-
|2021 || 8 || 1 || 0 || 1st Midwest Region (Division I)American Conference Champions || Won First Round Playoff Game (Arlington Impact) Won Div I Semifinals(Cali-War)Lost Division I Championship (Boston Renegades)
|-
|2022 || 6 || 3 || 0 || 1st Midwest Region (WFA Pro)American Conference Champions||Won First Round Playoff Game (Nevada Storm)WonPro Div Semifinals (Cali-War)Lost Pro Division Championship (Boston Renegades)
|-
!Totals || 100 || 90 || 0
|colspan="2"| (including playoffs)

* = Current Standing

Season schedules

1999

2000

2001

2002

2003

2004

2005

2006

2007

2008

2009

2010

2011

2012

2013

2014

2015

2016

2017

2018

2019

2020
No season due to COVID-19

2021 
The 2021 WFA Football Season is scheduled to begin the weekend of May 1st. The reason for this change is attributed to teams in certain states not being able to have practices/tryouts due to COVID-19 Restrictions

2022 
The 2022 WFA Football Season is scheduled to begin the weekend of April 9th

References

External links 
 Minnesota Vixen website
 December 1998 article about founding of team

American football teams in Minneapolis–Saint Paul
Independent Women's Football League
American football teams established in 1999
1999 establishments in Minnesota